The 1970 Idaho Vandals football team represented the University of Idaho in the 1970 NCAA University Division football season. The Vandals were led by first-year head coach Don Robbins and were members of the Big Sky Conference, then in the college division of the NCAA. Without a usable stadium on their Moscow campus for a second year, they played their home games at Rogers Field at Washington State University in Pullman, Washington.

Season
Winless after six games, they won four straight before dropping the finale. Entering the homecoming game on October 24, Idaho had a ten-game losing streak.

In the Battle of the Palouse, the Vandals suffered a fourth straight loss to neighbor Washington State of the Pac-8, falling  at Joe Albi Stadium in Spokane on September 19. After a scoreless first quarter, Idaho led by ten at halftime, but was then outscored . It broke a ten-game losing streak for the Cougars, and was their only win of the season. The game with WSU was not played in 1969 or 1971.

The Big Sky added two teams this season, but the Vandals played neither. The new rivalry with Boise State began in 1971 and Idaho did not schedule Northern Arizona until 1975.

The Vandals' former venue on campus, Neale Stadium, had been declared structurally unsafe due to soil erosion in the summer of 1969, and its south grandstand burned that November in a suspected arson. Idaho played home games at Rogers Field in Pullman in 1969 and 1970.  In April 1970, Rogers Field also burned in a suspected arson, which destroyed most of the primary grandstand on the south sideline, including the press box. WSU played its home games in 1970 and 1971 in Spokane at Joe Albi Stadium. Requiring less seating capacity, Idaho continued at Rogers in 1970, with reserved seating switched to the north side and students in the unburned lower section of the south grandstand. The new Idaho Stadium opened in October 1971.

University division 
Through 1977, the Big Sky was a college division (renamed Division II in 1973) conference for football, except for university division (Division I) member Idaho, which moved down to the new Division I-AA in 1978. Idaho maintained its upper division status in the NCAA by playing university division non-conference opponents (and was ineligible for the college division postseason).

Schedule

Roster

All conference
Four Vandals were selected to the all-Big Sky team: wide receiver Terry Moreland, halfback Fred Riley, defensive end Tim Reese, and linebacker Ron Linehan, a repeat pick.

NFL Draft
No Vandals were selected in the 1971 NFL Draft, which lasted seventeen rounds (442 selections).

Three juniors were selected in the 1972 NFL Draft, also seventeen rounds.

List of Idaho Vandals in the NFL Draft

References

External links
Gem of the Mountains: 1970-71 University of Idaho yearbook – 1970 football season
Go Mighty Vandals – 1970 football season 
Official game program: Idaho vs. Washington State at Spokane –  September 19, 1970
Idaho Argonaut – student newspaper – 1970 editions

Idaho
Idaho Vandals football seasons
Idaho Vandals football